Grimpoteuthis is a genus of pelagic umbrella octopuses known as the dumbo octopuses. The name "dumbo" originates from their resemblance to the title character of Disney's 1941 film Dumbo, having a prominent ear-like fin which extends from the mantle above each eye. There are 17 species recognized in the genus.  Prey include crustaceans, bivalves, worms and copepods. The average life span of various Grimpoteuthis species is 3 to 5 years.

Species and taxonomy 

As noted above, many species collected on the Challenger expedition were initially classified in the genera Cirroteuthis and Stauroteuthis. Several species formerly classified as Grimpoteuthis were moved to genera Cirroctopus and Opisthoteuthis.  A new family, Grimpoteuthididae (alternatively spelled Grimpoteuthidae), has been proposed to accommodate Grimpoteuthis and those of genera Enigmatiteuthis, Cryptoteuthis, and Luteuthis. The persistent confusion and disparity about the taxonomy of these species has been attributed to the poor quality and limited number of specimens available for study.

Range and habitat
Species of Grimpoteuthis are assumed to have a worldwide distribution, living in the cold, abyssal depths ranging from 1,000 to 7,000 metres.  Specimens have been found off the coast of Oregon, the Philippines, Martha's Vineyard, the Azores, New Zealand, Australia, California, Gulf of Mexico, Papua, and New Guinea. Last observation was 21.06.2022 at 1250 meters by the vessel Normand Ocean that uses underwater drones to inspect platforms. This time they were to examine chains and risers at the Aasta Hansteen platform outside Trøndelag in Norway.

Dumbo octopuses are the deepest living octopuses known, with some specimens captured or observed in hadal depths. One Grimpoteuthis sp. specimen was captured 60 km southeast of Grand Cayman at 7,279 m, but this depth is uncertain (as the specimen may have been captured while the net was descending to depth). However, in 2020, Grimpoteuthis was spotted 6,957 m deep in the Java Trench, confirming the hadal distribution of this genus.

Threats 
Natural predators of cirrate octopuses include large teleost fish and sharks, and even marine mammals such as Sperm Whales and Seals, but these are mostly predators of other cirrate genera and Grimpoteuthis has only been recorded in the stomach contents of a shark.

The Grimpoteuthis do not have an ink sac (as is the case with all cirrate octopuses). Furthermore, the cirrate octopuses lack innervated chromatophores and are therefore not capable of changing color  (despite some unreferenced statements to the contrary). How cirrate octopuses escape or avoid predators is largely unknown.

Movement, characteristics, and food supply
Observations of animals in the Atlantic reveal that Grimpoteuthis often rest on the seafloor with the arms and web spread out and uses its arms to slowly crawl along the seafloor, when disturbed the webbing and arms are contracted to push the animal off the seafloor with it then transitioning to movement using the mantle fins for rapid locomotion. Although it has been suggested that species of Grimpoteuthis are capable of jet-propulsion (while swimming using the fins), this has since been deemed unlikely. 

Feeding behavior has not been directly observed in Grimpoteuthis, but presumably is similar to Opisthoteuthis that trap small prey items in the webbing (either by enclosing the prey in the arm webbing or between the webbing and the seafloor) and then use the cirri (fingerlike projections along the arms) to move food to the mouth. Known prey items (from dissected animals) include benthic polychaetes, benthopelagic copepods, amphipods and isopods.

Breeding
The cirrate octopuses are classified as 'continuous spawners', females carry multiple eggs in various stages of maturation and only lay one-or-two eggs at a time, with no seasonality in spawning (however most of these aspects of reproductive biology have only been confirmed in Opisthoteuthis, not Grimpoteuthis). Mating in cirrate octopuses has never been observed, and unlike other octopuses, members of Cirrata lack a hectocotylus for the transfer of sperm packets. Cirrate octopus eggs are large and have a tough casing surrounding the chorion (not found in other octopuses), and Grimpoteuthis in particular attach their eggs to deep sea corals (octocorals). The female cirrate octopus does not guard or incubate the eggs (again unlike other octopuses). Grimpoteuthis hatchlings emerge as "fully competent" juveniles with all of the sensory and motor features to survive on their own.

Sexual dimorphism between males and females are less noticeable and consistent in Grimpoteuthis compared to other cirrate octopuses (such as Opisthoteuthis). In some species (e.g., G. bathynectes and G. discoveryi), the males have enlarged suckers relative to the females, but no such enlargement is found in other Grimpoteuthis species.

References

External links
Dumbo Octopus video at BBC

Octopuses
Cephalopods of Oceania
Molluscs of the Atlantic Ocean
Molluscs of the Pacific Ocean